Carphina petulans is a species of longhorn beetle of the subfamily Lamiinae. It was described by Theodor Franz Wilhelm Kirsch in 1875, and it is known from northern central Brazil, eastern Ecuador, French Guiana, Peru, and Bolivia.

References

Beetles described in 1875
Carphina